Live on Stage is the second album by the Australian Gypsy fusion band Monsieur Camembert. At the ARIA Music Awards of 2002 it won the ARIA Award for Best World Music Album. Most of the tracks are from a live concert recorded for ABC Radio National.

Track listing
All arrangements by Monsieur Camembert
"Dark Eyes" (trad.) – 6:28
"Grine Kuzine" (trad.) – 2:49
"The Fat Lady" (Yaron Hallis) – 5:11
"Choubi" (trad.) – 2:59
"Elixir in C" (trad.) – 6:59
"Istanbul" (Kennedy / Simon) – 6:53
"Odessa Bulgarish" (trad.) – 5:01
"Avinu Malkeinu" (trad.) – 4:26
"Cliches" (Yaron Hallis) – 5:37
"Tchavolo Swing" (Dorado Schmitt) – 4:36
"Yiddish Medley" (trad.) – 5:21
"Sirba" (trad.) – 4:50
"Monti's Czardas" (Monti) – 5:25

Personnel

References

Monsieur Camembert albums
2001 live albums
ARIA Award-winning albums